Barış Memiş (born 5 January 1990) is a Turkish professional footballer. He plays as an attacking midfielder for Sarıyer. In 2011 he was banned from football for two years for using banned substances.

Life and career 
Memiş began his football career in 2002 when he signed a youth contract with Trabzonspor. He was promoted to the senior squad in 2007, following the departure of Gökdeniz Karadeniz.

At the start of the 2008–09 season, Memiş was given the number 61, which is of significance because it is the city code of Trabzon. The number has since been given to Ibrahima Yattara. Memiş signed a three-year contract extension on 1 June 2009 and another one on 1 June 2012.

In 2011 he was banned from football for two years for using banned substances.

Honours
Trabzonspor
Turkish Cup: 2009–10
Turkish Super Cup: 2010

References

External links
 
 

1990 births
People from Akçaabat
Living people
Turkish footballers
Turkey youth international footballers
Turkey under-21 international footballers
Turkey B international footballers
Association football midfielders
Turkish sportspeople in doping cases
Trabzonspor footballers
Karşıyaka S.K. footballers
1461 Trabzon footballers
Kayseri Erciyesspor footballers
Adanaspor footballers
Eyüpspor footballers
Sarıyer S.K. footballers
Süper Lig players
TFF First League players
TFF Second League players
TFF Third League players